The Hillside Public Schools are a comprehensive community public school district that serves students in kindergarten through twelfth grade from Hillside, in Union County, New Jersey, United States.

As of the 2018–19 school year, the district, comprising six schools, had an enrollment of 3,123 students and 260.7 classroom teachers (on an FTE basis), for a student–teacher ratio of 12.0:1.

The district is classified by the New Jersey Department of Education as being in District Factor Group "CD", the sixth-highest of eight groupings. District Factor Groups organize districts statewide to allow comparison by common socioeconomic characteristics of the local districts. From lowest socioeconomic status to highest, the categories are A, B, CD, DE, FG, GH, I and J.

Schools
Schools in the district (with 2018–19 enrollment data from the National Center for Education Statistics) are:

Elementary schools
Abram P. Morris Early Childhood Center (636 students; in grades PreK-1)
April Lowe, Principal
Calvin Coolidge Elementary School (205; grade 2)
James Harden, Principal
Hurden Looker School (461; 3-4)
Tracey Wolff, Principal
George Washington School (488; grade 5)
Sharon Festante, Principal
Middle school
Walter O. Krumbiegel Middle School (452; 6-8) **Joyce Caine, Principal
High school
Hillside High School (842; 9-12)
Christine Sidwa, Principal

History
Hillside High School on Liberty Avenue was originally constructed in 1947, replacing the Coe Avenue (A.P. Morris) School which became a grammar school. Additions were later added to accommodate the baby-boomers of the 1950s and 1960s. In the mid-1960s the high school held some 1,500 students.

Administration
Core members of the district's administration are:
A. Robert Gregory, Acting Superintendent
David Eichenholtz, Business Administrator / Board Secretary

Board of education
The district's board of education, with nine members, sets policy and oversees the fiscal and educational operation of the district through its administration. As a Type II school district, the board's trustees are elected directly by voters to serve three-year terms of office on a staggered basis, with three seats up for election each year held (since 2012) as part of the November general election.

References

External links
Hillside Public Schools
 
School Data for the Hillside Public Schools, National Center for Education Statistics

Hillside, New Jersey
New Jersey District Factor Group CD
School districts in Union County, New Jersey